The Norwegian Academy for Language and Literature, commonly known as the Norwegian Academy, is a Norwegian learned body on matters pertaining to the modern Norwegian language in its Dano-Norwegian variety, now commonly known as Riksmål and Bokmål. The academy was established in the Norwegian government's honorary residence Grotten in 1953 based on the model of the Swedish Academy and the French Academy, but the idea was originally conceived by Bjørn Bjørnson in 1913. Its members are elected for life on the basis of scholarly, literary or artistic merits. The academy publishes the main dictionary of Norwegian, Det Norske Akademis ordbok ("Dictionary of the Norwegian Academy", www.naob.no), is responsible for regulating the written standard known as Riksmål ("National Language") and has a literary and cultural purpose. The academy awards the Norwegian Academy Prize in memory of Thorleif Dahl.

History

The academy was founded in 1953 by several notable Norwegian authors and poets, among them Arnulf Øverland, Sigurd Hoel, A.H. Winsnes, Cora Sandel and Francis Bull. They disagreed with the official language policy aiming to merge Bokmål with Nynorsk and protested against what they called state discrimination against the dominant Norwegian written standard Riksmål. This was Norway's de facto written language, used by most large newspapers and by the majority of the population as a written standard (although not necessarily a spoken one). The Academy was modelled after the Swedish Academy and the French Academy.

In addition to regulating Riksmål, the most conservative and Danish-near form of Norwegian, the academy publishes dictionaries and supports the publishing of literature in Riksmål. To-day, after several reforms worth in the official Bokmål and in the traditional Riksmål, Bokmål in its "moderate" version and modern Riksmål more or less coincide with some deviations.

The Academy has 51 members (2021), each of whom is a specialist in miscellaneous areas of analysis, investigation and expertise. These include Nordic studies, German, English and French languages and literature, history, philosophy, law, political science, poetry et cetera. The President of the Academy is John Ole Askedal.

The Norwegian Academy for Language and Literature was represented, along with other non-governmental language organisations, in the Norwegian Language Council, which regulates the official Bokmål and Nynorsk languages, since its establishment in 1972 until it was reorganized in 2005.

In 1981, the Academy merged with Riksmålsvernet, founded in 1919.

Members 
The following are current members of the Norwegian Academy for Language and Literature:

Nils August Andresen
John Ole Askedal
Bodil Aurstad
Kjetil Bang-Hansen
Trond Berg Eriksen
Liv Bliksrud
Tor Bomann-Larsen
Fredrik Bull-Hansen
Bentein Baardson
Lars Saabye Christensen
Arnold Eidslott
Thor Falkanger
Ivo de Figueiredo
Lise Fjeldstad
Dagfinn Føllesdal
Karin Gundersen
Tor Guttu
Cathrine Grøndahl
Erik Fosnes Hansen
Håkon Harket
Per Egil Hegge
Nils Heyerdahl
Roy Jacobsen
Christian Janss
Egil Kraggerud
Sissel Lange-Nielsen
Hanne Lauvstad
Mari Lending
Tom Lotherington
Jørn Lund (korresponderende)
Carina Nilstun
Helge Nordahl
William Nygaard
Kjell Arild Pollestad
Per Qvale

Hilde Sejersted
Ole Michael Selberg
Rune Slagstad
Arild Stubhaug
Henrik Syse
Jan Jakob Tønseth
Helene Uri
Trond Vernegg
Finn-Erik Vinje
Peter Normann Waage
Egil A. Wyller
Vigdis Ystad
Knut Ødegård

See also 
 Norsk ordbok (Riksmål)
 Language academy
 Swedish Academy

References

External links 
Official site 

Language organisations of Norway
Language regulators
National academies
Norwegian language
Norwegian literature
Organizations established in 1953